The 1928 Summer Olympics, officially known as the Games of the IX Olympiad and commonly known as Amsterdam 1928, was an international multi-sport event that was celebrated from 28 July to 12 August 1928 in Amsterdam, Netherlands. The city of Amsterdam had previously bid for the 1920 and 1924 Olympic Games, but was obliged to give way to war-torn Antwerp in Belgium for the 1920 Games and Pierre de Coubertin's Paris for the 1924 Games.

The only other candidate city for the 1928 Olympics was Los Angeles, which would eventually be selected to host the Olympics four years later. In preparation for the 1932 Summer Olympics, the United States Olympic Committee reviewed the costs and revenue of the 1928 Games. The committee reported a total cost of US$1.183 million with receipts of US$1.165 million, giving a negligible loss of US$18,000, which was a considerable improvement over the 1924 Games.

The United States won the most gold and overall medals.

Host city selection 
Dutch nobleman Frederik van Tuyll van Serooskerken first proposed Amsterdam as host city for the Summer Olympic Games in 1912, even before the Netherlands Olympic Committee was established.

The Olympic Games were cancelled in 1916 due to World War I. In 1919, the Netherlands Olympic Committee abandoned the proposal of Amsterdam in favor of their support for the nomination of Antwerp as host city for the 1920 Summer Olympics. In 1921, Paris was selected for the 1924 Summer Olympics on the condition that the 1928 Summer Olympics would be organized in Amsterdam. This decision, supported by the Netherlands Olympic Committee, was announced by the International Olympic Committee (IOC) on 2 June 1921.

Los Angeles bid for the 1928 Summer Olympics was without success in 1922 and again in 1923. The city was eventually selected as host city for the 1932 Summer Olympics, being the only bidder for that year.

Highlights 
These were the first Olympics to be organized under the IOC presidency of Henri de Baillet-Latour.
 A symbolic fire was lit for the first time for the duration of the Olympics, a tradition that continues to this day. The first Olympic flame and torch relay, however, would not take place until the 1936 Summer Olympics.

 For the first time, the parade of nations started with Greece, which holds the origins of the Olympics, and ended with the host country, a tradition which has also continued ever since.
 The Games were officially opened by Prince Hendrik, consort of Queen Wilhelmina, who had authorized her husband to deputise for her. The Queen was unable to attend the opening ceremony as she was on holiday in Norway and did not want to disrupt her trip. This was the second time a head of state had not personally officiated at an Olympic opening ceremony (the first occasion being the 1904 Games in St. Louis, Missouri, which were officially opened by David R. Francis the Mayor of St. Louis). The Queen had initially refused to make an appearance at either the opening or closing ceremony; it is thought that she objected to the Netherlands hosting the 1928 Games as she considered the Olympics to be a demonstration of paganism. However, she returned from Norway before the conclusion of the Games, to be present at the closing ceremony, and she presented the first prizes at the prize distribution which was held immediately beforehand.

 The sponsor Coca-Cola made its first appearance at the Olympic Games.
 Many cars were expected for the Games, but Amsterdam had no more than 2,000 single car parking spaces. Consequently, a number of new parking sites were provided and a special parking symbol was launched to show foreign visitors where they could park. The white P on a blue background was to become the international traffic sign for parking, which is still used today.
 These Games were the first to bear the name "Summer Olympic Games", to distinguish them from the Winter Olympic Games.
 These Games were the first to feature a fixed schedule of sixteen days, which is still followed since 1984. In previous Olympics, competition had been stretched out over several months.
 Athletics events were held on a 400-meter track, later becoming the standard for athletics tracks.
 Germany returned to the Olympic Games for the first time since 1912, after being banned from the 1920 and 1924 Games. The German team finished second in the 1928 medal count.
 Lithuania would compete as a nation at the Summer Olympics for the last time until 1992, as a result of political problems and its occupation by the Soviet Union
 South American football made a definite breakthrough, as Uruguay retained its title by defeating Argentina.
 India took its first ever gold medal in field hockey, beginning a streak of six consecutive gold medals in the sport.

Athlete highlights
 Paavo Nurmi of Finland won his ninth, and final, gold medal in the 10,000 m race.
 Canadian athlete Percy Williams exceeded expectations by winning both the 100 m and 200 m sprint events.
 Crown Prince Olav, who would later become King of Norway; won a gold medal in the 6 meter sailing event.
 Pat O'Callaghan won the first ever medal for a newly independent Ireland, taking gold in the hammer throw.
 Betty Robinson of USA won the women's 100 metres in a world record time of 12.2 seconds. She was still just 16 years of age at the time. 
 Algerian-born marathon runner Boughera El Ouafi won a gold medal for France in the men's marathon.
 Johnny Weissmuller, who later appeared in several Tarzan movies, won two gold medals in swimming: an individual gold in the men's 100 m freestyle, and a team gold in the men's 4  x 200 m freestyle relay.

Sports 
During the 1928 Summer Olympics, there were 14 sports, 20 disciplines and 109 events in the tournament. In parentheses is the number of events per discipline.

Women's athletics and team gymnastics debuted at these Olympics, in spite of criticism. Five women's athletics events were added: 100 meters, 800 meters, high jump, discus, and 400 meter hurdles. In protest of the limited number of events, British women athletes, boycotted the Games. Halina Konopacka of Poland became the first female Olympic track and field champion. Reports that the 800 meter run ended with several of the competitors being completely exhausted were widely (and erroneously) circulated. As a result, the IOC decided that women were too frail for long-distance running, and women's Olympic running events were limited to 200 meters until the 1960s.

Tennis disappeared from the program, only to reappear in 1968 as a demonstration sport.

Demonstration sports 
 Kaatsen
 Korfball
 Lacrosse

These Games also included art competitions in five categories: architecture, painting, sculpture, literature, and poetry. However, the IOC no longer considers these to be official medal events, so the medals awarded are not included in today's Olympic medal counts.

Venues 

Fourteen sports venues were used for the 1928 Summer Olympics. The Swim Stadium was demolished in 1929. The Het Kasteel football stadium was renovated in 1998–99. The Monnikenhuize stadium was demolished in 1950. The Schermzaal sports hall has also been demolished. The Olympic Stadium was renovated between 1996 and 2000, and is still in use. The Old Stadion was demolished in 1929 and replaced with housing in the Amsterdam area.

Participating nations 

A total of 46 nations were represented at the Amsterdam Games. Malta, Panama, and Rhodesia (now Zimbabwe) competed at the Olympic Games for the first time. Germany returned after having been banned in 1920 and 1924.

Number of athletes by National Olympic Committees 

<noinclude>

Medal count 

These are the top ten nations that won medals at the 1928 Games.

Poster 

The official poster for the Games displaying a running man in a white shirt was designed by Jos Rovers however the IOC never succeeded in obtaining the copyright of the image. The IOC used a different poster, with the German text Olympische Spiele, and an athlete partly covered in the Dutch national flag, holding a peace leaf in his hand. The poster was made for a German book about the Amsterdam Olympics.

Last surviving competitor 
The last living competitor of the 1928 Summer Olympics was Clara Marangoni, a member of the silver medal-winning Italian gymnastic team who had been twelve years old during the Olympics. Marangoni died 18 January 2018, at the age of 102 as the oldest living Olympic medalist at the time of her death.

See also

References

External links 

 
 The Ninth Olympiad. Amsterdam 1928. Official Report
 "Louis S. Nixdorff Diary, 10 July – 15 August 1928" 
 Memorabilia of the Ninth Olympiad 1928 Amsterdam

 
Summer Olympics, 1928
Amsterdam-Zuid
Summer Olympics
1920s in Amsterdam
Olympic Games in the Netherlands
Summer Olympics
Summer Olympics by year
Summer Olympics
Summer Olympics